Out TV may refer to:

 OutTV (Canada), a Canadian television channel targeted at LGBT viewers
 OutTV (Europe), the Netherlands-based international counterpart

See also
 TV-out